Penang Island is part of the state of Penang, on the west coast of Peninsular Malaysia. It was named Prince of Wales Island when it was occupied by the British East India Company on 12 August 1786, in honour of the birthday of the Prince of Wales, later King George IV. The capital, George Town, was named after the reigning King George III.

Malaysia has another island called "Pulau Pinang", which is a diving site located in South China Sea and part of the Johor Marine Park, which consists of a group of islands: Pulau Aur, Pulau Dayang, Pulau Lang, and Pulau Pinang itself.

History

Penang was originally part of the Malay Sultanate of Kedah. On 11 August 1786, Captain Francis Light of the British East India Company landed in Penang and renamed it Prince of Wales Island in honour of heir to the British throne. Light then received it as a portion on his purported marriage to the daughter of the Sultan of Kedah, although there is no evidence supporting this, as Light was married to Martina Rozells, a Eurasian he met in Phuket. Light ceded Penang to the Government of India and promised the Sultan military protection from Siamese and Burmese armies who were threatening Kedah. Light is now credited as the founder of Penang.

Many early settlers succumbed to malaria, earning Penang the epithet "the White Man's Grave".

Unbeknownst to the Sultan, Light had acted without the approval of the East India Company when he promised military protection. When the Company failed to aid Kedah when Siam attacked it, the Sultan tried to retake the island in 1790. The attempt was unsuccessful, and the Sultan was forced to cede the island to the company for an honorarium of 6,000 Spanish dollars per annum. This was later increased to 10,000 dollars, with Province Wellesley on the mainland of the Malay Peninsula being added to Penang in 1800. An annual honorarium of 10,000 ringgit continues to this day be paid by the Malaysian Federal Government to the state of Kedah.

In 1826, Penang, along with Malacca and Singapore, became part of the Straits Settlements under the British administration in India, moving to direct British colonial rule in 1867. In 1946 it became part of the Malayan Union, before becoming in 1948 a state of the Federation of Malaya, which gained independence in 1957 and became Malaysia in 1963. The island was a free port until 1969.

Geography

It is also the most populated island in the country with an estimated population of 678,000. The island is connected with the mainland by two Penang Bridges. The 1st bridge begins at Gelugor on the island and ends in Perai on the mainland while the 2nd bridge is located to its south. The mainland portion of the Penang state is known as Seberang Perai (Province Wellesley), and together with Penang Island and other smaller islands, form the state of Penang.

Governance and law

Penang Island is under the state of Penang, which is one of the four states in Malaysia without a Sultan and the head of the state is the Yang di-Pertua Negeri (English: State Ruler), which is appointed by the Yang di-Pertuan Agong of Malaysia.
The island forms the local government area of the Penang Island City Council and is divided into two administrative districts—South West Penang Island and North East Penang Island.

Other than a state ruler, Penang's executive members are led by a chief minister. The current chief minister of Penang is Chow Kon Yeow, and the post has been continuously held by a non-Malay ethnic Chinese since independence, reflecting the state's ethnic majority.

Local Authorities
The local council on the island is the Penang Island City Council (Majlis Bandaraya Pulau Pinang). Local councillors have been appointed by the state government since local elections were abolished in Malaysia in the 1960s. The city council is made up of a mayor, a municipal secretary and 24 councillors. The mayor is appointed by the State Government for two-year term of office while the councillors are appointed for one-year term of office. Penang Island is divided into 2 administrative districts.

The eastern portion of the island facing the mainland is highly urbanised and built-up with either industrial, commercial or residential areas. The western portion is generally more rugged/hilly and less developed than the rest of the island.

See also
Hayat Mahmud, Bengali feudal lord and military commander imprisoned in Penang Island

Notes

References

 Penang FAQs